Gilles Constantinian (born October 27, 1964 in Lyon, France) is a former professional footballer. He played as a centre forward.

External links
Gilles Constantinian profile at chamoisfc79.fr

1964 births
Living people
Footballers from Lyon
French footballers
Association football forwards
Olympique Lyonnais players
FC Gueugnon players
Chamois Niortais F.C. players
US Créteil-Lusitanos players
Grenoble Foot 38 players
Nîmes Olympique players
Racing Besançon players
Ligue 2 players
FC Vaulx-en-Velin players